Meeks is an unincorporated community in Bell County, in the U.S. state of Texas. According to the Handbook of Texas, the community had a population of 15 in 2000. It is located within the Killeen-Temple-Fort Hood metropolitan area.

History
Meeks also went by the name of Casey. A post office was established at Meeks in 1902 and remained in operation until 1906. The community had two businesses and 25 residents in 1933. Its population zenith was 40 in 1949 and had two businesses in a cluster of buildings a mile apart. The community appeared to go by the names of both Casey and Meeks in the 1940s but was only called Meeks in 1964. At that time, the population dropped to 10, then grew to 15 from 1988 through 2000.

Geography

Education
In the first half of the 20th century, Meeks had two schools for White students. Casey School, located in the community, had 55 students in 1903, while Meeks school, located a mile north, had 51 students in 1905. They remained in 1949. Today, the community is served by the Rogers Independent School District.

References

Unincorporated communities in Texas
Unincorporated communities in Bell County, Texas